Sun Prairie West High School (SPWHS) is a high school in Sun Prairie, Wisconsin, United States. It is one of two high schools in the Sun Prairie Area School District, the other being Sun Prairie East High School. During the 2022-2023 school year, there were 1,365 students at Sun Prairie West High School. SPWHS is a WIAA Division 1 school and is a member of the Big Eight athletic conference in all sports except for football, in which it is a WIAA Division 2 school and a member of the Badger Conference.

In the summer of 2010, Sun Prairie High School moved to a new building in the southeast part of town. The former school became a combined 8th and 9th grade upper middle school and was named Cardinal Heights Upper Middle School. Cardinal Heights later became a 6th-8th grade middle school and was renamed to Central Heights Middle School. In 2022, the school split into 2 high schools, Sun Prairie West High School and Sun Prairie East High School, with SPWHS getting a new campus on Ironwood Drive and SPEHS keeping the Grove Street Campus. 

The school was opened in a ribbon-cutting ceremony on August 28th, 2022, with Wisconsin governor Tony Evers in attendance. The construction of SPWHS was the culmination of an effort that started in 2019 with a $164,000,000 referendum.

Extracurricular activities

Athletics
Sun Prairie West includes a 3-court competition gym that seats 2,100, 2 single-court auxiliary gyms, an 8-lane olympic-size swimming pool with 2nd floor spectator seating, a weight room, a cardio room, a wrestling room, and has an indoor track on the 2nd floor circling the gym. The south auxiliary gymnasium is designed for gymnastics, complete with a foam pit, and is the home of the Sun Prairie Gymnastics Team, which is a joint team between SPWHS and SPEHS.

Sun Prairie West plays home football, soccer, and lacrosse games at Bank of Sun Prairie Stadium at Ashley Field, a multi-purpose stadium that seats 4,000. The stadium was built in 2022 to replace the original Ashley Field that was built in 1953 on the same site, 155 Kroncke Drive. SPWHS shares the venue with Sun Prairie East. The stadium features aluminum bleachers, team rooms, a multi-purpose synthetic turf field with team colors of both high schools, 2 concession stands, multiple restroom facilities, and ample parking. 

The SPHS hockey team, a joint team with SPEHS, plays at the Sun Prairie Ice Arena on Grove Street.

State championships before split (as Sun Prairie High School) 

 Baseball: 1974, 1994, 1997, 2005, 2006, 2012, 2013, 2014, 2021
 Bowling: 2015, 2016
 Cross Country (girls): 2016, 2017
 Football: 1995
 Golf (boys): 1991
 Hockey: 1997
 Softball: 2018

Academic Decathlon 
Sun Prairie's Academic Decathlon team has placed in the top three at the Wisconsin state finals five times.

In April 2014, the Sun Prairie Academic Decathlon team represented Wisconsin in the Large School division of the National United States Academic Decathlon online national competition taking fifth place among the large schools. They repeated this in 2016.

Music 
Sun Prairie West includes a Performing Arts Center (PAC) that seats 822. The PAC's 2400 square-foot stage features a 24-line fly system with a full fly loft, an orchestra pit with a removable cover, and a custom-made Wenger Diva acoustical shell system. The PAC is also home to a Steinway D Concert Grand Piano.  SPWHS also features a black-box theater that seats 120 and features overhead catwalks and tension grids that allow for innovative lighting designs.

The Sun Prairie High School Jazz I has been selected to compete in the Essentially Ellington Jazz Band competition in New York City 12 times since the festival's conception, most recently in 2018. When SPHS split into two, Jazz I became a joint extracurricular between Sun Prairie East High School and Sun Prairie West High School.  The SPHS theater department has been nominated for numerous Jerry Awards for both their cast and crew.

Notable alumni 

 Gary Hebl, class of 1969 (before split); Wisconsin State Assembly, 2005-present
 John A. List, class of 1987 (before split); University of Chicago economist
 Thomas A. Loftus (Graduated before split); Wisconsin Legislator and diplomat; Ambassador to Norway, 1993-1997
 Steven Quale, class of 1984 (before split); Hollywood film director
 Andy Thompson, class of 1994 (before split); major league baseball player with the Toronto Blue Jays, 2000

References

External links

Public high schools in Wisconsin
Schools in Dane County, Wisconsin